Adventures in Rainbow Country was a Canadian television series, which aired on CBC Television in the 1970-71 TV season. Reruns were later shown on the American children's cable channel Nickelodeon during the early 1980s. A half hour family drama, the show starred Lois Maxwell (of James Bond fame) as Nancy Williams, a widow raising her children Billy (Stephen Cottier) and Hannah (Susan Conway) in rural Northern Ontario.

Setting 
The show was filmed in 1969 around Whitefish Falls, which is near Espanola, Ontario, Canada. Many scenes were also shot at Birch Island and on Manitoulin Island.

Production and broadcasts
The show was very popular in Canada and technically never cancelled or axed. No further episodes were produced after the first season.
There were 26 episodes produced in total.

The series was also broadcast in the 70s in Australia on the ABC.

It has continued to air in repeats, both in Canada and internationally – in Canada, the show had been seen on DejaView and Silver Screen Classics. In Great Britain it aired on ITV, In Australia, the series is screened on GEM.

Cast
 Stephen Cottier as Billy Williams
 Buckley Petawabano as Pete Gawa, Billy's Ojibwa friend
 Susan Conway as Hannah Williams
 Albert Millaire as Roger Lemieux, photographer/journalist
 Wally Koster as Dennis McGubgub, bush pilot
 Alan Mills as Dougal MacGregor, tugboat skipper
 Lois Maxwell as Nancy Williams

Guest appearances 
Actors who made appearances on the show included Donald Harron, Ken James, Chris Wiggins, Austin Willis, Peter Donat, Gordon Pinsent, Margot Kidder, Len Birman, Percy Rodrigues, Duke Redbird, Jean-Louis Roux, Murray Westgate, Anthony Kramreither and Eric Christmas.

Episodes
 "La Chute" (20 September 1970)
 "The Tower" (27 September 1970)
 "The Frank Williams' File" (4 October 1970)
 "Skydiver" (11 October 1970)
 "The Kid from Spanish Harlem" (18 October 1970)
 "Panic in the Bush" (25 October 1970)
 "Long Tough Race" (1 November 1970)
 "The Town That Died" (8 November 1970)
 "The Eye of the Needle" (15 November 1970)
 "Girl on a Tightrope" (22 November 1970)
 "The Return of Eli Roqcue" (29 November 1970)
 "Roar of the Hornet" (6 December 1970)
 "Lac du Diable" (13 December 1970)
 "The Muskies Are Losing Their Teeth" (20 December 1970)
 "Milk Run" (27 December 1970)
 "A Wall of Silence" (3 January 1971)
 "Where the Rice Grows Wild" (10 January 1971)
 "Bird Watchers" (17 January 1971)
 "The Boy Who Loved Animals" (24 January 1971)
 "Mystery at Whaleback Bay" (31 January 1971)
 "Night Caller" (7 February 1971)
 "Lake on Blue Mountain" (14 February 1971)
 "Stolen Tugboat" (7 March 1971)
 "The Hermit" (14 March 1971)
 "Pursuit Along the Aux Sauble" (21 March 1971)
 "Dreamer's Rock" (28 March 1971)

Legacy
The Sudbury and Manitoulin Districts are to this day known as the Rainbow Country tourist region, as a result of this series.

A cast, crew and fan reunion event took place in Whitefish Falls from 11 to 14 August 2006.

References

External links
Adventures in Rainbow Country Fan Site
Queen's University Directory of CBC Television Series (Adventures in Rainbow Country archived listing link via archive.org)

Episode guide at TVarchive.ca
An episode for viewing

1970 Canadian television series debuts
1971 Canadian television series endings
1970s Canadian drama television series
CBC Television original programming
Northern Ontario in fiction
Television shows set in Ontario
Television shows filmed in Ontario